Park Jung-woo (born 1969) is a South Korean film director and screenwriter. Park is a screenwriter turned director, and probably ranks as South Korea's most well-known screenwriter for his famous stories such as Attack the Gas Station (1999), Last Present (2001), Kick the Moon (2001), Break Out (2002) and Jail Breakers (2002). In 2004, he debuted with his directorial feature Dance with the Wind (2004). His third feature Deranged (2012) is a refreshing and unique take on the disaster genre, was a hit with more than 4.5 million admissions.

Filmography

As director 
Dance with the Wind (2004)
Big Bang (2007)
Deranged (2012)
Pandora (2016)

As assistant director 
Beyond the Mountain (1991)
I Wish for What Is Forbidden to Me (1994)
To You from Me (1994)
A Man Wagging His Tail (1995)
Change (1997)
Oasis (2002)

As screenwriter 
The Last Defense (1997)
First Kiss (1998)
Attack the Gas Station (1999)
Promenade (2000)
Last Present (2001)
Kick the Moon (2001)
Break Out (2002)
Jail Breakers (2002)
Dance with the Wind (2004)
Big Bang (2007)
Thirsty, Thirsty (2009)
Descendants of Hong Gil-dong (2009)
Deranged (2012)
Pandora (2016)

As executive producer 
Dance with the Wind (2004) (also as investor)

As script editor 
I Wish for What Is Forbidden to Me (1994)
Never to Lose (2005)

Awards 
2002 23rd Blue Dragon Film Awards: Best Screenplay (Jail Breakers)
2003 39th Baeksang Arts Awards: Best Screenplay (Break Out)

References

External links 
 
 
 

1969 births
Living people
South Korean film directors
South Korean screenwriters
South Korean film producers